The M. Lloyd Frank Estate, also known as the Frank Manor House, is an historic building on campus of Lewis & Clark College, in Portland, Oregon. It is listed on the National Register of Historic Places.

It was the first architectural commission that Herman Brookman received, having just moved to Portland in 1923 or 1924. The house was completed in 1926 by the McHolland Brothers construction company. The roof is composed of Pennsylvania slate.

Bach designed other metalwork as well. Brookman designed the majority of the estate.

See also
 National Register of Historic Places listings in Southwest Portland, Oregon

References

External links
 

1924 establishments in Oregon
Herman Brookman buildings
Houses completed in 1924
Houses on the National Register of Historic Places in Portland, Oregon
Lewis & Clark College buildings
Southwest Portland, Oregon
Portland Historic Landmarks